San Martín de la Vega is a Spanish municipality located in Comarca de Las Vegas, Community of Madrid. It had a population of 19,656 in 2013.

Its church is dedicated to Natividad de Nuestra Señora (16th-18th centuries). The Spanish Warner Bros. Park is located in its area.

References

External links
 :es:San Martín de la Vega 
 Web Oficial 

Municipalities in the Community of Madrid